Raimondo Mei (1743-after 1810) was an Italian composer who was maestro di cappella at Pavia. He composed several operas including an Ipermestra and an Ifigenia in Aulide to the librettos of Metastasio.

References

1743 births
1810s deaths